Sand is a naturally occurring, finely divided rock. 

Sand may also refer to:

Arts, entertainment, and media

Fictional characters
Sand, alias of DC Comics fictional character Sandy Hawkins
Elia Sand, a character in Game of Thrones
Sandman, fictional character in children's folklore
The Sand Snakes, characters in Game of Thrones

Films
Sand (1949 film), a 1949 American western film nominated for best Cinematography 
Sand (2000 film), a 2000 American drama film starring Michael Vartan
The Sand, a 2015 horror film, also titled Blood Sand
Sand City, a 2015 film made in Tamil as Manal Naharam

Literature
Sand (novel), a 2011 novel by Wolfgang Herrndorf
Sand: a journey through science and imagination (UK) or Sand: The Never-Ending Story (US), 2009 book by geologist Michael Welland

Music
Sand (band), British post-punk band
Sand (album), 1987 album by Allan Holdsworth
"Sand" (Lee Hazlewood song), 1966 song by Lee Hazlewood
"Sand", a 1997 song by The Lovemongers that originally appeared on the album Whirlygig

Television
 "Sand" (Charlie Jade), an episode of the television series Charlie Jade
 "Sand", an episode of the television series Blake's 7

Places

France
Sand, Bas-Rhin, a commune in the Bas-Rhin department in the Grand Est region

Germany
Sand am Main, a municipality in the district of Haßberge in Bavaria

Hungary
Sand, Hungary, a village in Zala County

Norway
Sand, the historic name (1837–1886) for the former municipality of Bjarkøy in the old Troms county
Sand, Innlandet, a village in Nord-Odal municipality in Innlandet county
Sand (municipality), a former municipality in Rogaland county
Sand, Rogaland, a village in Suldal municipality in Rogaland county

Switzerland
Sand, Chur, a village in Chur municipality in the canton of Grisons
Sand, Meiringen, a village in Meiringen municipality in the canton of Bern

United Kingdom
Sand, Applecross, a place on the Applecross Peninsula in Wester Ross, Scotland
Sand, Shetland Islands, a parish in the West Mainland of Shetland in Scotland

United States
Sand City, California,  a city in Monterey County, California

Other places
Sand, Iran (disambiguation)
Sand Creek (disambiguation)
Sand Hill (disambiguation)
Sand Island (disambiguation)
Sand Lake (disambiguation)
Sand Mountain (disambiguation)
Sand Point (disambiguation)
Sand River (disambiguation)

Science and healthcare
S And, a variable star
SAnD, an abbreviation of social anxiety disorder, to differentiate it from seasonal affective disorder
SAND protein, a membrane protein

Other uses
Sand (color), shade that resembles the color of beach sand
Sand (surname)
Rheum, also called "sand" or "sleep", the deposit found in the eye after sleep

See also
Sand art (disambiguation)
Grains of Sand (disambiguation)
Sande (disambiguation)